This article lists a selection of notable works created by Franz Marc. The listing follows the book Franz Marc: 1880-1916.

Paintings

Museums
Art Institute of Chicago
Detroit Institute of Arts
Franz Marc Museum, Kochel
Hamburger Kunsthalle
Harvard Art Museums
Kunsthalle Bremen
Kunstmuseum Basel
Kunstmuseum Bern
Kunsthalle Mannheim
Lenbachhaus, Munich
Museum Boijmans Van Beuningen, Rotterdam
Museum Folkwang, Essen
Museum Kunstpalast, Düsseldorf
Museum Ludwig, Cologne
National Gallery of Art, Washington D.C.
Neue Pinakothek, Munich
Norton Simon Museum, Pasadena
Pinakothek der Moderne, Munich
Pushkin Museum, Moscow
Saarland Museum, Saarbrücken
Saint Louis Art Museum
San Francisco Museum of Modern Art
:de:Schwabinger Kunstfund, Munich
Solomon R. Guggenheim Museum, New York City
Sprengel Museum, Hanover
Staatliche Kunsthalle Karlsruhe
Staatsgalerie Stuttgart
Städel Museum
The Phillips Collection, Washington D.C.
Thyssen-Bornemisza Museum, Madrid
Von der Heydt Museum, Wuppertal
Walker Art Center, Minneapolis
Westphalian State Museum of Art and Cultural History, Münster

Media
Canvas
Cardboard
Color
Mural
Oil paint
Paper
Plaster
Tempera
Wood

See also
 Hut in Dachau Moors (1902)
 Indersdorf (1904)
 Two Women on the Hillside (1906)
 Horses in Landscape (1911)
 Blue Horse I (1911)
 The Large Blue Horses (1911)
 Fox (1911)
 Yellow Cow (1911)
 Little Blue Horse (1912)
 Fate of the Animals (1913)
 The Tower of Blue Horses (1913)
 The Foxes (1913)

Notes

References

External links

 
 
 

Marc
Marc
Marc